Owen Stanley Range is the south-eastern part of the central mountain-chain in Papua New Guinea.

History
Owen Stanley Range was seen in 1849 by Captain Owen Stanley while surveying the south coast of Papua and named after him. The eastern extremity of the range is Mount Victoria, which was climbed by Sir William MacGregor in 1888, and it extends as far west as Mount Thynne and Lilley. But the name is generally used to denote the whole of the chain of the Papuan Peninsula, from Mount Chapman  to the south-eastern end of the island, and to include Mount Albert Edward  which is really separated from it by the Wharton Chain.

Geography

The range is flanked by broken and difficult country, particularly on the south-western side. There are few practicable passes, the easiest being the famous Kokoda Track which crosses the range between Port Moresby and Buna and was in use for more than 50 years as a regular overland mail-route. Another route used by the 900 men of the US 2nd Battalion, 126th Infantry Regiment, 32nd Division, was the Kapa Kapa Trail, parallel to but  to the southeast of the Kokoda Track. They took nearly five weeks to cover the  track over extraordinarily difficult jungle terrain, from 14 October to 20 November 1942. 

Vehicular roads, though not impossible, would be very difficult and expensive to construct. In fact one was constructed during World War II crossing from Wau in the north to Bulldog in the south and known as the Bulldog Track. It was largely due to the impossibility of transporting heavy equipment across the range that the Japanese failed to secure Port Moresby as a base early in 1942. The mountains are rough and precipitous, with occasional fertile plateaus which are occupied by native food-gardens.

Eponyms
Two species of reptiles are named after Owen Stanley Range, Papuascincus stanleyanus and Toxicocalamus stanleyanus.

See also
Australian Encyclopaedia. Vol. 6, p. 430. Grolier.
Owen Stanley Range languages

References

Mountain ranges of Papua New Guinea